The Penn Quakers women's basketball team is the intercollegiate women's basketball program representing University of Pennsylvania. The school competes in the Ivy League in Division I of the National Collegiate Athletic Association (NCAA). The Quakers play home basketball games at the Palestra in Philadelphia, Pennsylvania.

History
The Quakers have a 562–654 as of the 2017–18 season. They have won five Ivy League titles (2001, 2004, 2014, 2016, 2017). They were the champion of the first Ivy League women's basketball tournament in 2017, beating Princeton 57–49. Penn won the Big 5 in 2015.

Postseason appearances
Penn has gone to the NCAA Division I women's basketball tournament five times. The Quakers are 0–5.

References

External links